Ney Bid (also Romanized as Ney Bīd; also known as Nabīd) is a village in Rayen Rural District, Rayen District, Kerman County, Kerman Province, Iran. At the 2006 census, its population was 25, in 6 families.

References 

Populated places in Kerman County